Sad Hill Unearthed is a 2017 Spanish documentary film directed by Guillermo de Oliveira.

It has interviews with Clint Eastwood, Ennio Morricone, and stars Metallica. It was released at Sitges Film Festival. It is set in the locations where The Good, the Bad and the Ugly was shot, including Sad Hill Cemetery where Clint Eastwood, Lee Van Cleef and Eli Wallach had their showdown. The documentary shows the reconstruction of the cemetery.

It was nominated for Goya Awards for Best Documentary Film.

Cast

References

External links
 
 

2017 films
Spanish documentary films
2017 documentary films
Films shot in Spain
Films set in Spain
Dollars Trilogy